NetPoint is a graphically-oriented project planning and scheduling software application first released for commercial use in 2009. NetPoint's headquarters are located in Chicago, Illinois. The application uses a time-scaled activity network diagram to facilitate interactive project planning and collaboration. NetPoint provides planning, scheduling, resource management, and other project controls functions.

NetPoint is capable of calculating schedules using both the Critical Path Method (CPM) as well as the Graphical Path Method (GPM).

Schedules created in NetPoint can be exported for use in Primavera, Microsoft Project, and other CPM-based Project management software.

See also
Project planning
Project management
Project management software
Comparison of project management software
Schedule (project management)
Critical path method

References

External links
Gilbane: Interactive Scheduling
Mosaic: List of Scheduling Tools
CPM in Construction Management: List of CPM Software

Project management software
Critical Path Scheduling
Schedule (project management)